Airborne is the first solo studio album by former Eagles guitarist Don Felder recorded during the period that the band was broken up. It was his only solo album until 2012's Road to Forever. It featured  Carlos Vega, Joe Vitale, Russ Kunkel, Tris Imboden, Timothy B. Schmit, Jeff Lorber, Paulinho Da Costa, Joe Lala, Kenny Loggins, Dave Mason and Albhy Galuten.

Felder's surname on the album cover stylized similar to the Fender Musical Instruments Corporation logo, showing the similarity of spelling and Don Felder's affinity for electric guitars manufactured by Fender.

Track listing 
All tracks by Don Felder unless otherwise noted:

Side One
"Bad Girls" – 4:48
"Winners" – 4:39
"Haywire" – 5:09
"Who Tonight" – 4:57

Side Two
"Never Surrender" (Felder, Kenny Loggins) –  4:17
"Asphalt Jungle" – 4:11
"Night Owl" (Felder, George "Chocolate" Perry, Joe Vitale) –  4:33
"Still Alive" – 4:48

Personnel
Don Felder - lead vocals, guitars, keyboards, synthesizer
George "Chocolate" Perry, George Hawkins, Nathan East - bass
Jeff Lorber, Joe Vitale, Michael Murphy - keyboards
Albhy Galuten, Anthony Marinelli -  synthesizer
Carlos Vega, Joe Vitale, Russ Kunkel, Tris Imboden - drums
Paulinho da Costa - percussion
James Pankow, Lee Loughnane - horns
Joe Vitale - flute
Dave Mason, Kenny Loggins, Timothy B. Schmit - background vocals
Johnny Mandel - string arrangement
Jim Shea - photography

Notes 

1983 debut albums
Don Felder albums
Albums arranged by Johnny Mandel
Wounded Bird Records albums
Asylum Records albums
Albums recorded in a home studio